Freistatt Township is an inactive township in Lawrence County, in the U.S. state of Missouri.

Freistatt Township took its name from the community of Freistatt, Missouri.

References

Townships in Missouri
Townships in Lawrence County, Missouri